Satchwell v President of the Republic of South Africa and Another is a 2002 decision of the Constitutional Court of South Africa which determined that the same-sex life partner of a judge was entitled to the same financial benefits available to the opposite-sex spouse of a judge. The case, which challenged the Judges' Remuneration and Conditions of Employment Act, 1989, was brought by Kathy Satchwell, an openly lesbian judge of the Transvaal Provincial Division (now known as the Gauteng Division) of the High Court.

The court ruled unanimously that the law violated the equality clause of the Bill of Rights, which forbids unfair discrimination on the basis of sexual orientation. The judgment therefore amended the law to extend the spousal benefits to same-sex partners who had undertaken "reciprocal duties of support". Although the holding, strictly speaking, was limited to judges and their partners, it was seen as having a wider effect, with the director of the Lesbian and Gay Equality Project describing it as "yet another step toward the formal legal recognition of same-sex relationships".

In 2003 it was realised that a new version of the act (the Judges' Remuneration and Conditions of Employment Act, 2001) had been passed and, due to a drafting error, still included the former discriminatory language. The Constitutional Court granted an order applying the reasoning of its earlier ruling to the new act.

References

External links
 Text of the main 2002 judgment
 Media summary of the judgment
 Text of the subsequent 2003 judgment

Constitutional Court of South Africa cases
2002 in LGBT history
2002 in case law
2002 in South African law
South African same-sex union case law